Claudius Körber (born 2 January 1982 in Dresden) is a German theater actor.

Life and career 
Claudius Körber was born 1982 in Dresden. He completed a study acting from 2003 to 2007 at the Max-Reinhardt-Seminar in Vienna. Körber appeared in numerous productions at the Max Reinhardt Seminar, including "The Arabian Nights", "Richard III", "Walls" and "0". In 2007, he was seen in "Der Ubu-Komplex" by D. Maayan on the Schauspielhaus Wien.

Since the season 2007/2008 Claudius Körber is a member of the ensemble of the Schauspielhaus in Graz. Here he was seen in the role of Oedipus in the eponymous play by Sophocles.

In the season 2009/2010 Körber played the title role in Macbeth, directed by Anna Badora. In October 2010, Körber had his premiere as Hamlet directed by Theu Boerman in the Schauspielhaus Graz.

Awards 
 2006: Hersfeld-Preis
 2011: Nominated for the Nestroy Theatre Prize as Hamlet in Hamlet by William Shakespeare and as Peer Gynt in Peer Gynt by Henrik Ibsen 
 2012: He won the Nestroy Audience Award

References

External links
 Short biography in: Max Reinhardt Seminar 
 Short biography in: Schauspielhaus Graz 

1982 births
Living people
German male stage actors
Actors from Dresden